List of Guggenheim Fellowships awarded in 2008.

U.S. and Canadian Fellows

A
 Len Ackland, Associate Professor, School of Journalism and Mass Communication, University of Colorado, Boulder: Nuclear power at a crossroads. 
 Martha Ackmann, Writer, Leverett, Massachusetts; Senior Lecturer in Gender Studies, Mount Holyoke College: Toni Stone's challenge to baseball and America. 
 Yacine Ait-Sahalia, Otto Hack 1903 Professor of Finance and Economics, Princeton University: The econometrics of jumps and volatility. 
 Ken Alder, Professor of History and Milton H. Wilson Professor of the Humanities, Northwestern University: Personal identification from the Renaissance to the genome. 
 Meena Alexander, Poet, New York City; Distinguished Professor of English, Hunter College and CUNY Graduate Center: Poetry. 
 Geri A. Allen, Composer, Upper Montclair, New Jersey; Associate Professor of Jazz Piano and Improvisation, University of Michigan: Music composition. 
 Natalia Almada, Filmmaker, Mexico City and Brooklyn, New York: Filmmaking. 
 Margaret Lavinia Anderson, Professor of History, University of California, Berkeley: The Armenian Genocide: A German story. 
 Nancy Evelyn Andrews, Professor of Art and Design, College of the Atlantic: Filmmaking. 
 Rae Armantrout, Poet, San Diego, California; Professor of Poetry and Poetics, University of California, San Diego: Poetry. 
 Douglas N. Arnold, Professor of Mathematics, University of Minnesota, Twin Cities: Finite element exterior calculus. 
 Shimon Attie, Visual Artist, Brooklyn, New York: Video installation.

B
 Dean Bakopoulos, Writer, Mineral Point, Wisconsin; Executive Director and Lillian Greenwood Artist-in-residence, Shake Rag Alley Center for the Arts, Mineral Point: Fiction. 
 Randy E. Barnett, Carmack Waterhouse Professor of Legal Theory, Georgetown University Law Center: The reconstructed constitution. 
 Mason Bates, Composer, Oakland, California: Music Composition. 
 Keith Bearden, Filmmaker, Long Island City, New York: Filmmaking. 
 Brigitte Miriam Bedos-Rezak, Professor of History, New York University: The imprint and a logic of signs in medieval Europe (1150-1350). 
 Jeffrey L. Bennetzen, Norman and Doris Giles Professor of Molecular Biology and Functional Genomics, University of Georgia: Genetic diversity and population structure in the parasitic weed Striga and its crop hosts in Mali. 
 Toni Bentley, Writer, Los Angeles, California: General Nonfiction. 
 Michael P. Berman, Artist and Photographer, San Lorenzo, New Mexico: Photography. 
 Harry Bernstein, Writer, Brick, New Jersey: Now in my nineties. 
 Michael D. Bess, Chancellor's Professor of History, Vanderbilt University: A historian's perspective on human biological enhancement. 
 João Biehl, Associate Professor of Anthropology, Princeton University: Transcendental values and political life in postcolonial Brazil: The Mucker War. 
 Erika Blumenfeld, Artist, Marfa, Texas: Environment-based installation. 
 Howard Bodenhorn, Professor of Economics, Clemson University; Research Associate, National Bureau of Economic Research, Cambridge, Massachusetts: The political economy of Jacksonian New York. 
 Tim Bowling, Poet, Edmonton, Alberta, Canada: Poetry. 
 Stanley Brandes, Professor of Anthropology, University of California, Berkeley: Pets and their people. 
 Michael F. Brenson, Independent Scholar, Accord, New York: A biography of David Smith. 
 Art Bridgman/Myrna Packer, Choreographers, Valley Cottage, New York; Codirectors, Bridgman/Packer Dance: Choreography. 
 Carlyle Brown, Playwright, Minneapolis, Minnesota: Drama. 
 Michael Paul Burkard, Poet, Syracuse, New York; Associate Professor of English, MFA Program in Creative Writing, Syracuse University; Instructor, Bennington Writing Seminars, Bennington College: Poetry.

C
 chameckilerner, Artist Collective, New York City, New York: Choreography and Video
 Christopher Celenza, Professor, Department of German and Romance Languages, Johns Hopkins University: Humanism and language from Petrarch to Poliziano. 
 Lan Samantha Chang, Professor of Creative Writing, and Director, The Program in Creative Writing, University of Iowa Writers' Workshop: Fiction. 
 Meiling Cheng, Associate Professor of Critical Studies and English, and Director of Critical Studies, School of Theatre, University of Southern California: Contemporary time-based art in China. 
 Dan Chiasson, Poet, Sudbury, Massachusetts; Assistant Professor of English, Wellesley College: Poetry. 
 Kyong Mee Choi, Composer, Chicago, Illinois; Assistant Professor of Music Composition, Roosevelt University: Music composition. 
 Paul Clemens, Assistant to the Dean, College of Liberal Arts and Sciences, Wayne State University: Dismantling a Detroit auto plant. 
 Deborah Cohen, Associate Professor of History, Brown University: Family secrets in Britain, 1840-1990. 
 Lewis Mitchell Cohen, Director of Renal Palative Care Initiative, Baystate Medical Center, and Professor of Psychiatry, Tufts University School of Medicine: Allegations of murder in the medical community. 
 Ovidiu Costin, Professor of Mathematics, Ohio State University: Study of singular differential systems using generalized summability techniques.

D
 Bill Daniel, Filmmaker, Braddock, Pennsylvania: Filmmaking. 
 Sheldon Danziger, H. J. Meyer Distinguished University Professor of Public Policy, Gerald R. Ford School of Public Policy, University of Michigan: Four decades of antipoverty policies. 
 William deBuys, Professor of Documentary Studies, College of Santa Fe: An environmental history of the North American Southwest. 
 Alice Domurat Dreger, Associate Professor of Clinical Medical Humanities and Bioethics, Feinberg School of Medicine, Northwestern University: Science and identity politics in the Internet age. 
 Tony D'Souza, Writer, Sarasota, Florida: Fiction. 
 Laurent Dubois, Professor of History and Romance Studies, Duke University: A cultural history of the banjo.

E
 Nancy Easterlin, Professor of English, University of New Orleans: What is literature for?.
 Alexei A. Efros, Assistant Professor of Computer Science and Robotics, Carnegie Mellon University: Inferring geometric, photometric, and semantic scene properties from an image. 
 Rodney Evans, Filmmaker, Brooklyn, New York: Filmmaking.

F
 Xiaohui Fan, Associate Professor of Astronomy, Steward Observatory, University of Arizona: The end of cosmic Dark Ages: beyond the redshift seven barrier. 
 James Farquhar (academic), Associate Professor, Earth System Science Interdisciplinary Center and Department of Geology, University of Maryland: Isotopic investigations of microbial sulfur metabolisms. 
 Robert Feintuch, Artist, New York City; Senior Lecturer in Art, Bates College: Painting. 
 Molissa Fenley, Choreographer, New York City; Artistic Director, Molissa Fenley and Dancers; Associate Professor of Dance, Mills College: Choreography. 
 Giovanni R. F. ("John") Ferrari, Professor of Classics, University of California, Berkeley: Fiction and the limits of social meaning. 
 Leon Fink, UIC Distinguished Professor, Department of History, University of Illinois, Chicago: Regulating labor in the Atlantic world, 1800-2000. 
 Edward Fowler, Writer, Irvine, California; Professor, School of Humanities, University of California, Irvine: A family memoir. 
 Mark I. Friedman, Member and Associate Director, Monell Center, Philadelphia: Diet and obesity. 
 Victor A. Friedman, Andrew Mellon Professor in Slavic Languages and Literatures, University of Chicago: Multilingualism, identities, and the sociolinguistics of the Balkan Linguistic League. 
 Rachel Fulton, Associate Professor of History, University of Chicago: The Virgin Mary and the art of prayer, 1000-1500. 
 Joe Fyfe, Painter, Brooklyn, New York; Visiting Assistant Professor, Pratt Institute, Brooklyn: Painting.

G
 David Galenson, Professor in Economics and the College, University of Chicago: Conceptual revolutions in twentieth-century art. 
 Forrest Gander, Poet, Barrington, Rhode Island; Professor of English and Comparative Literature, Brown University: Poetry. 
 Sergey Gavrilets, Distinguished Professor, Department of Ecology and Evolutionary Biology, University of Tennessee: The social brain hypothesis: coevolution of genes, memes, and social networks. 
 Phoebe Gloeckner, Artist, Ann Arbor, Michigan; Assistant Professor, University of Michigan School of Art and Design: A graphic narrative. 
 Laurie R. Godfrey, Professor of Anthropology, University of Massachusetts, Amherst: Reconstructing Madagascar's vanished ecosystems. 
 Ann Goldstein, Editor and Translator, New York City; Editor, The New Yorker: The complete works of Primo Levi. 
 Elijah Gowin, Photographer, Kansas City, Missouri; Assistant Professor of Art and Art History, University of Missouri, Kansas City: Photography. 
 Allan Greer, Professor of History, University of Toronto: The practices of property in colonial North America. 
 Wendy Griswold, Professor of Sociology, Northwestern University: The Federal Writers' Project and American regionalism. 
 Edith Grossman, Translator, New York City: The "Soledades" of Luis de Góngora. 
 Sumit Guha, Professor of History, Rutgers University: Governing Caste: Identity and power in South Asia, 1600-1900. 
 Achsah Guibbory, Professor of English, and Chair, Department of English, Barnard College: The uses of Judaism in seventeenth-century England.

H
 Barbara Hahn, Distinguished Professor of German, Vanderbilt University: Hannah Arendt's literature. 
 Roya Hakakian, Writer, Woodbridge, Connecticut: The Assassins of the Turquoise Palace. 
 David M. Halperin, W. H. Auden Collegiate Professor of the History and Theory of Sexuality, University of Michigan, Ann Arbor: How to be gay. 
 William M. Hamlin, Professor of English, Washington State University: A history of John Florio's Montaigne. 
 Saar Harari, Choreographer, New York City; Artistic Director, LeeSaar The Company: Choreography. 
 Donald Harper, Professor, Department of East Asian Languages and Civilizations, University of Chicago: China in the age of manuscripts, fourth century B.C. to tenth century A.D. 
 Susanna B. Hecht, Professor of Urban Planning, University of California, Los Angeles: Deforestation in the rubber boom of the upper Amazon. 
 Robin Hemley, Professor of English and Director, Nonfiction Writing Program, University of Iowa: Revisiting one's own youth. 
 Denise L. Herzing, Research Director, Wild Dolphin Project, Jupiter, Florida; Research Faculty Member, Department of Biological Sciences, Florida Atlantic University: Underwater observations of wild dolphins. 
 Sue Hettmansperger, Artist, Iowa City, Iowa; Professor of Painting and Drawing, University of Iowa, Iowa City: Painting. 
 Bob Hicok, Poet, Blacksburg, Virginia; Associate Professor of Creative Writing, Virginia Polytechnic Institute and State University: Poetry. 
 Martha Himmelfarb, William H. Danforth Professor of Religion, Princeton University: Jewish eschatology and Christian empire. 
 Danny Hoch, Playwright, Brooklyn, New York: Drama. 
 Woody Holton, Associate Professor of History, University of Richmond: Abigail Adams, entrepreneur. 
 Michael E. Hood, Assistant Professor of Biology, Amherst College: Evolutionary ecology of a global disease distribution. 
 Daniel Horowitz, Mary Huggins Gamble Professor of American Studies, Smith College: Understanding consumer culture, 1951-2001. 
 Yonggang Huang, Joseph Cummings Professor, R. McCormick School of Engineering and Applied Science, Northwestern University: Atomistic-based continuum theory for nano-structured materials. 
 Sedrick Ervin Huckaby, Artist, Fort Worth, Texas; Adjunct Professor, University of Texas, Arlington: Painting. 
 James Hyde, Painter, Brooklyn, New York: Painting.

I
 Torben Iversen, Harold Hitchings Burbank Professor of Political Economy, Department of Government, Harvard University: Democracy, distribution, and the representation of economic interests.

J
 Bahram Javidi, Board of Trustees Distinguished Professor, University of Connecticut: Real-time automated detection and identification of biological microorganisms. 
 Margo Jefferson, Associate Professor, Eugene Lang College, The New School University; Professor of Professional Practice, Columbia University: Race: composition and improvisation. 
 Paul Christopher Johnson, Associate Professor, Center for Afroamerican and African Studies, and Department of History, and Director, Doctoral Program in Anthropology and History, University of Michigan, Ann Arbor: "Religion" and the purification of spirits.

K
 Robert Kanigel, Professor of Science Writing, Massachusetts Institute of Technology: On an Irish island. 
 Sean Keilen, Lecturer in English, Princeton University: Imitation and tradition in Renaissance poetry. 
 Martin Kersels, Artist, Sierra Madre, California; Codirector and Faculty Member, Program in Art, California Institute of the Arts: Installation art. 
 Chandrashekhar B. Khare, Professor of Mathematics, University of California, Los Angeles: Motives, Galois representations, and automorphic forms. 
 Laura L. Kiessling, Hilldale Professor of Chemistry and Biochemistry and Laurens Anderson Professor of Biochemistry, University of Wisconsin: Chemoselective reactions for biology. 
 Matthew Klam, Writer, Washington, DC; Visiting Associate Professor, Stony Brook University: Fiction. 
 Anthony Korf, Composer, New York City; Artistic Director, Riverside Symphony, New York City: Music composition.

L
 Elizabeth LeCompte, Theater Artist, New York City; Founding Member and Artistic Director, The Wooster Group: Drama. 
 Michael Leja, Professor, History of Art Department, University of Pennsylvania: The flood of pictures in the mid-nineteenth century. 
 Simon Leung, Artist, Los Angeles, California; Associate Professor of Studio Art, University of California, Irvine: Post-studio art. 
 Beth Levin, William H. Bonsall Professor in the Humanities, Stanford University: Crosslinguistic variation in event encoding. 
 Builder Levy, Photographer, New York City: Photography. 
 Michael J. Lewis, Faison-Pierson-Stoddard Professor of Art, Williams College: The pietist tradition in town planning. 
 Pam Lins, Sculptor, Brooklyn, New York; Adjunct Professor, Cooper Union School of Art: Sculpture. 
 Sam Lipsyte, Writer, New York City; Assistant Professor, School of the Arts, Columbia University: Fiction. 
 Shawn R. Lockery, Professor and Associate Director, Institute of Neuroscience, University of Oregon: Recordings of neuronal activity and behavior in freely moving animals. 
 Vyvyane Loh, Writer, Watertown, Massachusetts: Fiction.

M
 Glen M. MacDonald, Professor of Geography, University of California, Los Angeles: Climate warming, epic drought, and society. 
 Janet Maguire, Composer, Venice, Italy: Music composition. 
 Anne Makepeace, Filmmaker, Lakeville, Connecticut; Director, Writer, and Producer, Anne Makepeace Productions, Inc: Filmmaking. 
 Paolo Mancosu, Professor of Philosophy, University of California, Berkeley: The interplay between philosophy of mathematics and mathematical logic. 
 Fredrik Marsh, Photographer, Columbus, Ohio; Senior Lecturer in Art, Otterbein College: Photography. 
 Jack Marshall, Writer, El Cerrito, California: Poetry. 
 Tim Maudlin, Professor II of Philosophy, Rutgers University: New foundations for physical geometry. 
 Jane Mayer, Writer, Chevy Chase, Maryland; Staff Writer, The New Yorker Magazine: How America lost its way in fighting terrorism. 
 Judith Mayne, Distinguished Humanities Professor of French, Ohio State University: Continental films and French Occupation cinema. 
 Anthony McCall, Artist, New York City: Installation art. 
 Joanne Meyerowitz, Professor of History and American Studies, Yale University: Explaining human difference. 
 Greg Miller, Photographer, Brooklyn, New York: Photography. 
 Don Mitchell, Distinguished Professor, Department of Geography, Maxwell School, Syracuse University; Visiting Scholar, Annenberg School, University of Pennsylvania: Bracero: remaking the California landscape, 1942-1964. 
 Rebecca Morris, Artist, Los Angeles, California; Associate Professor of Painting, Pasadena City College: Painting. 
 Samuel Moyn, Professor of History, Columbia University: Human rights between morality and politics.
 Carlos Motta, Artist, New York City: Installation Art and Video

N
 Ardine Nelson, Photographer, Columbus, Ohio; Associate Professor, Department of Art, Ohio State University: Photography. 
 John Wallace Nunley, Independent scholar, St. Louis, Missouri: African art and the experience of slavery.

O
 Ruben Ochoa, Artist, Los Angeles, California; Adjunct Professor in Sculpture, University of California, Irvine: Installation art. 
 Peter Ozsváth, Professor of Mathematics, Columbia University: Heegaard diagrams and holomorphic disks.

P
 Myrna Packer/Art Bridgman, Choreographers, Valley Cottage, New York; Codirectors, Bridgman/Packer Dance: Choreography. 
 Richard Panek, Writer, New York City: At the dawn of the next universe. 
 Richard H. Pildes, Sudler Family Professor of Constitutional Law, New York University School of Law: Political power, democratic politics, and constitutional theory. 
 Claire Preston, Fellow and Lecturer in English, Sidney Sussex College, University of Cambridge: English literature and scientific investigation in the seventeenth century. 
 Richard Primus, Professor of Law, University of Michigan: Constitutional authority in the wake of civil war.

R
 Andrew Stein Raftery, Artist, Providence, Rhode Island; Associate Professor of Printmaking, Rhode Island School of Design: Engraving. 
 Rufus Reid, Composer, Bassist, and Clinician, Teaneck, New Jersey: Music composition. 
 Enrico Riley, Artist, Norwich, Vermont; Senior Lecturer and Area Head of Painting and Drawing, Dartmouth College: Painting. 
 Lance Rips, Professor of Psychology, Northwestern University: Concepts of individuals and their persistence. 
 Oren D. Rudavsky, Filmmaker, New York City: Filmmaking. 
 Paul Rudy, Composer, Kansas City, Missouri; Associate Professor and Coordinator of Composition, Conservatory of Music and Dance, University of Missouri, Kansas City: Music composition. 
 John Gerard Ruggie, Kirkpatrick Professor of International Affairs, Kennedy School of Government, Harvard University: Governing multinationals: the case of human rights. 
 Ben Russell, Filmmaker, Chicago, Illinois; Visiting Assistant Professor in Moving Image, University of Illinois: Filmmaking. 
 Nancy Ruttenburg, Professor of Comparative Literature, English, and Slavic Literatures, and Chair, Department of Comparative Literature, New York University: Dostoevsky and the culture of American democracy.

S
 Lisa Sanditz, Artist, Tivoli, New York: Painting. 
 Sigrid Sandström, Artist, Tivoli, New York; Assistant Professor of Studio Arts, Bard College: Painting. 
 Philip W. Scher, Associate Professor of Anthropology, University of Oregon: Tourism, the state, and the performance of identity in the neoliberal Caribbean. 
 Jeffrey Schiff, Artist, Brooklyn, New York; Professor of Art, Wesleyan University: Sculpture. 
 Laura Schwendinger, Composer, Madison, Wisconsin; Associate Professor of Composition, University of Wisconsin, Madison: Music composition. 
 Reginald Shepherd, Poet, Pensacola, Florida; Associate Poetry Faculty, Low-Residency MFA Program, Antioch University: Poetry. 
 Vicky Shick, Choreographer, New York City: Choreography. 
 Arthur P. Shimamura, Professor of Psychology, University of California, Berkeley: A neurocognitive approach to the psychology of art and aesthetics. 
 Gary Shiu, Associate Professor of Physics, University of Wisconsin, Madison: Connecting string theory to experiment. 
 Kathryn Sikkink, Regents Professor and McKnight Distinguished University Professor, University of Minnesota: The origins and effects of human rights trials in the world. 
 Susan S. Silbey, Leon and Anne Goldberg Professor of Humanities and Professor of Sociology and Anthropology, Massachusetts Institute of Technology: Trust and surveillance in the cultures of science. 
 Kaja Silverman, Class of 1940 Professor of Rhetoric, Film, and Art History, University of California, Berkeley: The miracle of analogy. 
 Ruth Lewin Sime, Professor Emeritus, Department of Chemistry, Sacramento City College: A biographical study of Otto Hahn. 
 Paul Sorrentino, Professor of English, Virginia Tech: The life of Stephen Crane. 
 Alan M. Stahl, Curator of Numismatics, Princeton University: The nexus of wealth and power in medieval Venice. 
 Kurt Stallmann, Composer, Houston, Texas; Assistant Professor and Lynette S. Autrey Chair, Shepherd School of Music, Rice University: Music composition. 
 Alexander Stille, San Paolo Professor of International Journalism, Graduate School of Journalism, Columbia University: Family matters: a memoir. 
 Katherine V. W. Stone, Professor of Law, University of California, Los Angeles: The remaking of labor relations in the twenty-first century. 
 Peter Stone, Associate Professor of Computer Sciences, University of Texas, Austin: Ad hoc teams of mobile robots. 
 Robin Stryker, Professor of Sociology and Affiliated Professor of Law, University of Minnesota, Minneapolis: Social science in government regulation of equal employment opportunity. 
 Marc A. Suchard, Assistant Professor of Biomathematics, Biostatistics, and Human Genetics: Towards solutions to the fundamental problems in statistical phylogenetics.

T
 David J. Taylor, Photographer, Las Cruces, New Mexico; Associate Professor of Photography, New Mexico State University, Las Cruces: Photography. 
 Keith Terry, Choreographer, Musician, and Dancer, Oakland, California; Artistic Director, Crosspulse: Choreography. 
 Christian Tomaszewski (C.T. Jasper), Artist, Brooklyn, New York; Lecturer in the Program in the Visual Arts, Princeton University: Fine arts. 
 Anton Treuer, Associate Professor of Ojibwe, Bemidji State University: Ojibwe grammar project. 
 Marc Trujillo, Artist, Sherman Oaks, California; Professor of Drawing and Painting, Santa Monica College: Painting.

V
 Alexander van Oudenaarden, Associate Professor of Physics, Massachusetts Institute of Technology: Stochastic gene expression in development. 
 Ashutosh Varshney, Professor of Political Science, University of Michigan: Cities and ethnic conflict: a multi-country study. 
 Mary Kay Vaughan, Professor of History, University of Maryland: Intimate paths to Mexico 1968. 
 Val Vinokur, Assistant Professor of Comparative Literature, Eugene Lang College, The New School: A translation of Marie Vieux Chauvet's Amour, colère, et folie.

W
 Roger D. Waldinger, Distinguished Professor, Department of Sociology, University of California, Los Angeles: America's new immigrants and their homeland connection. 
 Nicholas Watson, Professor of English and American Literature and Language, Harvard University: Vernacular theology and the secularization of England, 1050-1550. 
 Sarah Watts, Professor of History, Wake Forest University: The political satires of Lyonel Feininger. 
 Andrew Weaver, Professor, School of Earth and Ocean Sciences, University of Victoria, British Columbia, Canada: Biogeochemical feedbacks on polar climate stability. 
 Jonathan Weiner, Professor, Graduate School of Journalism, Columbia University: A book about science and art. 
 Barbara (Bobbi) Wolfe, Professor of Economics, Population Health Sciences, and Public Affairs, University of Wisconsin, Madison: Understanding the tie between income and health disparities. 
 Linda Woodbridge, Josephine Berry Weiss Chair in the Humanities and Professor of English, Pennsylvania State University: English revenge drama.

Y
 Donald A. Yates, Writer and Translator, St. Helena, California; Professor Emeritus of Latin American Literature, Michigan State University: Jorge Luis Borges: A life in letters. 
 Pamela Yates, Filmmaker, New York City; President and Cofounder, Skylight Pictures, Inc: Filmmaking. 
 Kevin A. Yelvington, Associate Professor of Anthropology, University of South Florida: Melville J. Herskovits and the making of Afro-American anthropology. 
 Rachel P. Youens, Artist, Brooklyn, New York; Adjunct Lecturer, Parsons School of Design; Adjunct Assistant Professor, LaGuardia Community College, City University of New York: Painting and sculpture. 
 Jason X.-J. Yuan, Professor of Medicine, University of California, San Diego: Role of ion channels in stem cell proliferation and differentiation.

Z
 Bill Zavatsky, Poet, New York City; Teacher of English, Trinity School, New York City: Poetry. 
 Miguel Zenón, Composer, New York City: Music composition. 
 Li Zhang, Associate Professor of Anthropology, University of California, Davis: The rise of psychotherapy in post-reform China. 
 Thad Ziolkowski, Writer, Brooklyn, New York; Associate Professor of English and Humanities, and Director, Writing Program, Pratt Institute: Fiction.
 Lisa Zunshine, Professor of English, University of Kentucky.

See also
Guggenheim Fellowship

References

External links
John Simon Guggenheim Memorial Foundation home page

2008
2008 awards
2008 art awards